Aleksandr Aleksandrovich Mokshantsev (2 or 5 June 1974) is a Russian former professional ice hockey defenceman. At the Elite level Mokshantsev played for Stroitel Karaganda during the 1994-95 season, Kristall Saratov during the 1995-96 season, and for Dizelist Penza between 1996 and 1998.

His son, also named Aleksandr Aleksandrovich Mokshantev (born February 17, 1995), is a hockey player who was drafted in the 4th round (107th overall) of the 2012 KHL Junior Draft by Lokomotiv Yaroslavl.

References

External links

1974 births
Living people
Sportspeople from Penza
Russian ice hockey defencemen
Soviet ice hockey defencemen